Dancesport at the 2005 Asian Indoor Games was held in Indoor Stadium Huamark, Bangkok, Thailand from 14 November to 15 November 2005.

Medalists

Standard

Latin

Medal table

Results

Standard

Five dances
15 November

Quickstep
14 November

Semifinals

Final

Slow foxtrot
14 November

Final

Tango
14 November

Preliminaries

Final

Viennese waltz
14 November

Final

Waltz
14 November

Preliminaries

Final

Latin

Five dances
14 November

Cha-cha-cha
15 November

Semifinals

Final

Jive
15 November

Semifinals

Final

Paso doble
15 November

Semifinals

Final

Rumba
15 November

Preliminaries

Final

Samba
15 November

Preliminaries

Final

References
 2005 Asian Indoor Games official website
 Japan DanceSport Federation
 The Asian DanceSport Federation

2005 Asian Indoor Games events
2005
Asian